Matthew Gargan (30 September 1885 – 10 March 1949) was an Irish hurler who played as a midfielder for the Kilkenny and Waterford senior teams.

Gargan made his first appearance for the Kilkenny team during the 1905 championship and was a regular member of the starting fifteen until his retirement after the 1917 championship. During that time he won five All-Ireland medals and five Leinster medals. He also frequently and illegally lined out with Waterford.

At club level Gargan enjoyed a lengthy career with Erin's Own.

References

1885 births
1949 deaths
Erin's Own (Kilkenny) hurlers
Kilkenny inter-county hurlers
Waterford inter-county hurlers
All-Ireland Senior Hurling Championship winners